Mordecai Galante (died 1781) was Chief Rabbi of Damascus during the Ottoman era and  author of Gedullat Mordekai, a collection of sermons preserved in manuscript at Damascus (Ḥazan, Ha-Ma'alot li-Shelomoh, p. 50).

See also
Galante (pedigree)

References

1781 deaths
People from Damascus
Chief rabbis of cities
Year of birth unknown
Sephardi rabbis in Ottoman Syria
18th-century rabbis from the Ottoman Empire
18th-century writers from the Ottoman Empire